Republika is a Croatian monthly magazine for literature, art and society. Established in 1945, it is published by Croatian Writers' Association and the Školska knjiga publishing company.

Timeline

 from 1945: monthly magazine for literature, art and public life
 from 1947: monthly magazine for literature, art and public issues
 from 1949: magazine for literature and art
 from 1972: magazine for cultural and social issues
 from 1983. to nr. 1/2003: magazine for literature
 from 2003. (nr.1) - today: monthly magazine for literature, art and society

Editors 
 1945: Miroslav Krleža, Vjekoslav Kaleb, Joža Horvat
 1946: Vjekoslav Kaleb
 1947-1948: Marin Franičević
 1949: Ivan Dončević
 1950-1951: Ivan Dončević, Marin Franičević, Jure Kaštelan
 1952: Ivan Dončević, Marin Franičević
 1953-6/1954: Ivan Dončević, Marin Franičević, Vlatko Pavletić
  7/1954.-1955: Ivan Dončević, Marin Franičević
 1955: Ivan Dončević, Marin Franičević, Novak Simić
 1956-8/1971: Ivan Dončević
 9/1971.-1972: Danilo Pejović
 1972: Ivan Raos, Stojan Vučičević
 1973-1979: Zvonimir Majdak
 1980-1981: Augustin Stipčević
 1982-1986: Branko Maleš
 1986- nr.7-9/2002: Velimir Visković
 2002- today: Ante Stamać

Sources
 Republika 

Croatian-language magazines
Croatian literature
Magazines published in Croatia
Literary magazines
Magazines established in 1945
Monthly magazines
1945 establishments in Yugoslavia
Magazines published in Yugoslavia